Claudio Felipe Hohmann Barrientos (born 3 June 1954) is a Chilean politician who served as minister of State under Eduardo Frei Ruíz-Tagle's government (1994–2000).

In 2012, he ended his link with the centre-left coalition Concertación de Partidos por la Democracia and supported to the right-wing pre-candidate Andrés Allamand.

References

External links
 Profile at Annales de la República

1954 births
Living people
Chilean people
Chilean people of German descent
Pontifical Catholic University of Chile alumni